The Waynesburg and Washington Railroad was a 28-mile 3 foot gauge subsidiary of the Pennsylvania Railroad. From the 1870s through the 1920s the line served its namesake towns in Southwestern Pennsylvania (often referred to as the Wayynie). After the 1930s, the line did struggle on, but mostly on paper. Today, all that remains from the railroad's heyday is one locomotive, a few stations, and a few images.
 
However, Greene County owes a lot to the Waynesburg and Washington Railroad because the rail system gave the county an opportunity to grow. By missing the western parts of the county, it continued to keep that portion hidden from progress. The east had already grown from the river, and the railroad supported the central section. Its beginnings were started because of the boom in oil and gas. Coal was already being mined on the eastern end of the county near the river. This railroad helped all the natural resource industries to grow and caused the increase in population in Waynesburg.

History
The Waynesburg and Washington Railroad ran between the county seats of Washington and Greene Counties. It was first conceived by John Day in 1874. The charter was signed in 1875 and work began in August of that year. It was to be a three-foot narrow gauge line, because of the current inclination toward the building of those types of lines and because they were cheaper to build.

The line had fallen by the wayside around the time of the Great Depression. The railroad suspended passenger service on July 9, 1929. There were rail truck services to the towns along the line until 1976, when the ownership passed to Conrail. The line is now used up for a portion as a rail link to a local coal mine. The other portions of the line are now abandoned. The line itself ran in crazy horseshoes and prompted many who rode the line to say that the "Waynie" had been designed by a snake. The line stretched out for twenty eight miles. Horseshoe Curve, named for the more famous one near Altoona, was an astounding 35 degrees, or 164 feet radius. The line rose from 900 feet above sea level at Waynesburg, the low point, to just above 1400 feet above sea level at Summit about four miles south of Washington. There were points where locomotives had a climb of 200 feet in less than two miles. This combination made for travel on the line quite grueling. Because of both of these facts there were never any locomotives with greater than six driving wheels. There were Moguls on the line in later times, but these had to have the center drivers blind. This made for an interesting rolling stock and mainline.

Waynesburg was the southern terminus. This was the main yard for the line and had a roundhouse, turntable, freight house, stockyard, all the associated yard structures for locomotives - and of course the station. The station was built in 1885 and the two track train shed was built in 1893. By 1904, the station had a long freight room, waiting room, ticket office, and the railroad's offices. The Downey House and the Walton House both had porters that met every train and shouted the name of their respective hotels. They toted luggage the several blocks uptown to the hotels.
 
When war broke, Company K would all pile into the coaches at the station to ride to Washington and then on to Pittsburgh. After the line started failing, the yard was torn up and the station was passed on to a local wool dealer and then to the county road department. The yard was completely gone by the 1980s, and the station was near collapse. In the late 1980s, the station was torn down; Conrail now has an office and a siding in this spot.

References

External links

W&WRR--HPP-GC

Defunct Pennsylvania railroads
3 ft gauge railways in the United States
Narrow gauge railroads in Pennsylvania
Predecessors of the Pennsylvania Railroad
Railway companies established in 1868
Railway companies disestablished in 1976
Transportation in Washington County, Pennsylvania